Nicolas Albert Bettannier (12 August 1851 – 17 November 1932), usually known as Albert Bettannier, was a French painter in the era of the French Third Republic.

Life

Bettannier was born in Metz in 1851 the son of Jean Bettannier and Marie Bellatte. He studied in the Moselle department. After the ceding of his native region Alsace-Lorraine to Germany following the French defeat in the Franco-Prussian War of 1871, he decided to keep his French nationality and moved to Paris. He enrolled in the Académie des beaux-arts where he followed courses given by Henri Lehmann and Isidore Pils. From 1881 onwards, he acquired some notoriety in the Salon des artistes français, where he frequently showed paintings depicting the loss of Alsace-Lorraine to Germany. He was a fierce proponent of French revanchism. The loss of Alsace-Lorraine was a recurring theme in his work.

Albert Bettannier was awarded the Legion d'honneur in 1908 for his work as a painter.

He died on 17 November 1932 and is buried at Vaugirard Cemetery in Paris.

Work
 La Tache noire (The Black Spot), Deutsches Historisches Museum, Berlin, 1887
 Le désespoir (The Despair), Musée de l'Ermitage, Saint-Pétersbourg, 1893
 La Conquête de la Lorraine (The Conquest of Lorraine), 1910
 L'Oiseau de France (The Bird of France), 1912.

Gallery

External links 

1851 births
1932 deaths
Artists from Metz
19th-century French painters
French male painters
20th-century French painters
20th-century French male artists
19th-century French male artists